Albion is a suburb in Melbourne, Victoria, Australia,  west of Melbourne's Central Business District, located within the City of Brimbank local government area.

Albion is bordered on the north by Ballarat Road, the south by Forrest Street, the west by Kororoit Creek and the east by Anderson Road. The suburb is completely surrounded by other parts of Sunshine except for Ardeer, which lies to Albion's due west across Kororoit Creek.

History

The area was originally called Darlington, from at least 1860 to about 1890. The area originally known as Albion was directly west of Duke Street, as can be noted by the many streets there named after English counties and placenames – Albion being an ancient name for the island of Great Britain.

Albion station opened on 5 January 1860 as Albion and Darlington but closed a year later. It was not until 1919 that a new station was opened on the same site with the name Albion station.

In March 1885 the Albion Quarrying Company began its operations in the area. The disused Albion quarry, accessed from Hulett Street in Sunshine, was the location for AC/DC's Jailbreak music video.

It was H. V. McKay of Sunshine Harvester Works fame who bought land to develop a residential community for his workers in first decades on the 20th century. His concept for Sunshine was the Sunshine Estate: a community developed according to the ideals of the Garden city movement, an influential town planning movement of the late 19th and early 20th centuries. This area was mainly in what is now called Albion. McKay's own residence, The Gables, was in Talmage Street (where the cul-de-sac The Gables now is) until it was consumed by fire and subsequently demolished.

Today

Albion has many period homes such as California bungalows and 1940s weatherboard houses. In the eastern parts of Albion, many of the oldest homes were built by H. V. McKay as part of his Sunshine Estate, a housing community built according to the influential early 20th Century Garden city movement.

Kororoit Creek provides the western border for Albion. Along it runs the Kororoit Creek Trail which runs all the way southwards to meet the Federation Trail in Brooklyn.

Stony Creek lies on the eastern edge of Albion, close to Anderson Road. , the creek's environmental state west of Anderson Road is very poor as it has long been converted to nothing more than a concrete stormwater drain for this particular section of its course.

A notable landmark of Albion is the red brick John Darling and Son Flour Mill built in 1922. It is just to the south of Ballarat Road, next to Albion train station.

Transport

Albion railway station is on the Sunbury line and lies in the Public Transport Victoria zones 1+2 overlap.

Metropolitan buses service the suburb and Albion station. These include:
215 Caroline Springs – Highpoint Shopping Centre via Albion station, Burnside Shopping Centre (every day). Operated by Kinetic Melbourne.
216 Caroline Springs – Brighton Beach via Deer Park West, Sunshine, Footscray, Melbourne CBD, St Kilda Road, Prahran and Elsternwick (every day). Operated by Kinetic Melbourne.
400 Sunshine – Laverton via Deer Park station, Dame Phyllis Frost Centre, Metropolitan Remand Centre, and Port Phillip Prison (every day). Operated by Transit Systems Victoria and CDC Melbourne.
451 Sunshine – Deer Park North via Deer Park station (every day). Operated by Transit Systems Victoria.
456 Sunshine – Woodgrove SC via Albion RS, Burnside SC, Caroline Springs, Melton (every day). Operated by Transit Systems Victoria.
903 Altona station – Mordialloc SC via Essendon, Northland SC, Box Hill, Chadstone SC (every day). Operated by Kinetic Melbourne.

Cyclists in Albion are represented by BrimBUG, the Brimbank Bicycle User Group. The Kororoit Creek Trail runs along Albion's western perimeter.

Facilities

Education
 Albion Primary School
 St Theresa's Catholic Primary School
 Albion Kindergarten

Sporting facilities
The Albion Cats are the local Australian rules football team. They compete in the Western Region Football League.

Other sports clubs include:
 Western Eagles (Association) Football Club
 Sunshine Baseball Club
 Sunshine Bowls Club
 Polish Sports Centre
 Sunshine United Cricket Club
 Ace GoKarts
 Albion Tennis Club
 Albion Thunder (part of the Community Soccer Hub)

Religious sites
 St Theresa's Catholic Church
 Slovakian Baptist Church
 Assemblies of God Church

See also
 City of Sunshine – Albion was previously within this former local government area.
 Albion railway station, Melbourne
 Kororoit Creek
 Kororoit Creek Trail

References 

Suburbs of Melbourne
Suburbs of the City of Brimbank